Apertifusus is a genus of sea snails, marine gastropod mollusks in the family Fasciolariidae, the spindle snails, the tulip snails and their allies.

Species
Species within the genus Apertifusus include:
 Apertifusus caparti (Adam & Knudsen, 1955)
 † Apertifusus clavatus (Brocchi, 1814) 
 † Apertifusus etruscus (Pecchioli, 1862) 
 Apertifusus frenguellii (Carcelles, 1953)
 Apertifusus josei (Hadorn & Rogers, 2000)
 Apertifusus meyeri (Dunker, 1869)

References

 Vermeij G.J. & Snyder M.A. (2018). Proposed genus-level classification of large species of Fusininae (Gastropoda, Fasciolariidae). Basteria. 82(4-6): 57-82

 
Gastropod genera